Baisali Mohanty (born 5 August 1994) is an international diplomat and United Nations official, author, Indian classical dancer and analyst of foreign and public policy. She is a regular contributor on foreign policy and strategic affairs to several prestigious international publications including American business magazine Forbes, The Huffington Post, The Diplomat and openDemocracy, London. 

She is the founder of Oxford Odissi Centre that is involved in promotion and training of Odissi dance at University of Oxford and other leading institutions in the United Kingdom.

She has been ALC Global Fellow for the year 2015–16 affiliated to University of Oxford.

In 2022, she was appointed as Special Envoy to Romania to coordinate evacuation from the war-hit Ukraine.

Early life and education
Baisali Mohanty was born on 5 August 1994 in Puri, Odisha, to renowned feminist, poet and author Manasi Pradhan and Radha Binod Mohanty, an electrical engineer from the Indian Institute of Technology.

She was educated at Blessed Sacrament High School Puri and KIIT International School, Bhubaneswar. She received her bachelor's degree in Politics and International Relations from the Lady Shri Ram College for Women, Delhi.

She earned her Master's Degree from University of Oxford with first division writing her dissertation on Nuclear Diplomacy.

Dancing career 

Baisali Mohanty received her training in Odissi dance from renowned Odissi teacher Padma Shri Guru Gangadhar Pradhan for over a decade until his demise. She received advance training in Choreography from another eminent Odissi teacher and choreographer Padma Shri Guru Ileana Citaristi. she holds a Visharad Degree in Odissi dance with first class distinction.

She has been performing solo and group choreographies with her own dance company "Baisali Mohanty & Troupe" in international and national festivals for over fifteen years.

Oxford Odissi Centre 
In 2015, she founded the Oxford Odissi Centre at University of Oxford to popularise Indian classical dance at the varsity. Beside holding regular Odissi dance classes for members of University of Oxford, the centre also conducts Odissi dance workshops at other institutions including University of Cambridge, London School of Economics, University College London (UCL), King's College London, University of Manchester and University of Edinburgh among others.

She is also the founder of Oxford Odissi Festival, a first of its kind annual Indian classical dance festival held at the University of Oxford by Oxford Odissi Centre.

Awards 

In 2013, she was felicitated by India's National Commission for Women at New Delhi on occasion of International Women's Day for her outstanding achievement. In the same year, her dance composition paying tribute to the 2012 Delhi gang rape victim won her the top prize at Delhi University dance contest across all categories.

In 2017, she was conferred with the prestigious Aarya Award for her contribution to Indian classical dance by 2014 Nobel Peace Prize winner Kailash Satyarthi.

See also 
 List of dancers
 Indian women in dance

References

External links
Vice Chancellor’s Message – Oxford India Policy Blog

www.opendemocracy.net
Baisali Mohanty | HuffPost
Baisali Mohanty | Scroll.in

1994 births
Living people
Alumni of the University of Oxford
Lady Shri Ram College alumni
Delhi University alumni
Odissi exponents
Indian classical choreographers
Dancers from Odisha
People from Puri
Performers of Indian classical dance
Indian women choreographers
Indian choreographers
International relations scholars
Foreign policy writers
Indian female classical dancers
Indian women columnists
Indian columnists
Indian political writers
Indian women political writers
21st-century Indian dancers
Women artists from Odisha
Women political scientists
Indian expatriates in the United Kingdom
21st-century Indian women artists